The 2015–16 season is Al Ahly's 57th season in the Egyptian Premier League and 57th consecutive season in the top flight of Egyptian football. The club will participate in the Premier League, Egypt Cup, Super Cup and the CAF Champions League.

Squad information

Current squad

Out on loan

Summer Transfers

In

2015 Egyptian Super Cup

Note: The team is managed by the Interim Coach Abdelaziz Abdelshafy in the 2015 Egyptian Super Cup.

2015–16 Egyptian Premier League

Position

Results

Results by round

Results overview

Match Details

2016 Egypt Cup

Round 32

Round of 16

Quarter-finals

Semi-finals

Final

2016 CAF Champions League

Round 32

Al Ahly won 2–0 on aggregate.

Round 16

Al Ahly won 3–2 on aggregate.

Group stage

Group A

Match Details

Champions Golden Cup
Friendly cup organized by IMCC Sports Co. between Al Ahly and Roma.

Al Ahly SC seasons
Al Ahly